Wenceslaus IV (also Wenceslas; ; , nicknamed "the Idle"; 26 February 136116 August 1419), also known as Wenceslaus of Luxembourg, was King of Bohemia from 1378 until his death and King of Germany from 1376 until he was deposed in 1400. As  he belonged to the House of Luxembourg, he was also Duke of Luxembourg from 1383 to 1388.

Biography
Wenceslaus was born in the Imperial city of Nuremberg, the son of Emperor Charles IV by his third wife Anna von Schweidnitz, a scion of the Silesian Piasts, and baptized at St. Sebaldus Church. He was raised by the Prague Archbishops Arnošt of Pardubice and Jan Očko of Vlašim. His father had the two-year-old crowned King of Bohemia in June 1363 and in 1373 also obtained for him the Electoral Margraviate of Brandenburg. When on 10 June 1376 Charles IV asserted Wenceslaus' election as King of the Romans by the prince-electors, two of seven votes, those of Brandenburg and Bohemia, were held by the emperor and his son themselves. Wenceslaus was crowned at Aix-la-Chapelle on 6 July.

In order to secure the election of his son, Charles IV revoked the privileges of many Imperial Cities that he had earlier granted, and mortgaged them to various nobles. The cities, however, were not powerless, and as executors of the public peace, they had developed into a potent military force. Moreover, as Charles IV had organised the cities into leagues, he had made it possible for them to cooperate in large-scale endeavors. Indeed, on 4 July 1376, fourteen Swabian cities bound together into the independent Swabian League of Cities to defend their rights against the newly elected King, attacking the lands of Eberhard II, Count of Württemberg. The city league soon attracted other members and until 1389 acted as an autonomous state within the Empire.

Rule

Wenceslaus took some part in government during his father's lifetime, and on Charles' death in 1378, he inherited the Crown of Bohemia and as king assumed the government of the Holy Roman Empire. In the cathedral of Monza there is preserved a series of reliefs depicting the coronations of the kings of Italy with the Iron Crown of Lombardy. The seventh of these depicts Wenceslaus being crowned in the presence of six electors, he himself being the seventh. The depiction is probably not accurate and was likely made solely to reinforce the claims of the cathedral on the custody of the Iron Crown.

In 1387 a quarrel between Frederick, Duke of Bavaria, and the cities of the Swabian League allied with the Archbishop of Salzburg gave the signal for a general war in Swabia, in which the cities, weakened by their isolation, mutual jealousies and internal conflicts, were defeated by the forces of Eberhard II, Count of Württemberg, at Döffingen, near Grafenau, on 24 August 1388. The cities were taken severally and devastated. Most of them quietly acquiesced when King Wenceslaus proclaimed an ambivalent arrangement at Cheb (Eger) in 1389 that prohibited all leagues between cities, while confirming their political autonomy. This settlement provided a modicum of stability for the next several decades, however the cities dropped out as a basis of the central Imperial authority.

King of Bohemia

During his long reign, Wenceslaus held a tenuous grip on power at best, as he came into repeated conflicts with the Bohemian nobility led by the House of Rosenberg. On two occasions he was even imprisoned for lengthy spells by rebellious nobles.

But the greatest liability for Wenceslaus proved to be his own family. Charles IV had divided his holdings among his sons and other relatives. Although Wenceslaus upon his father's death retained Bohemia, his younger half-brother Sigismund inherited Brandenburg, while John received the newly established Duchy of Görlitz in Upper Lusatia. The March of Moravia was divided between his cousins Jobst and Procopius, and his uncle Wenceslaus I had already been made Duke of Luxembourg. Hence the young king was left without the resources his father had enjoyed, although he inherited the duchy of Luxembourg from his uncle in 1383. In 1386, Sigismund became king of Hungary and became involved in affairs further east.

Wenceslaus also faced serious opposition from the Bohemian nobles and even from his chancellor, the Prague archbishop Jan of Jenštejn. In a conflict surrounding the investiture of the abbot of Kladruby, the torture and murder of the archbishop's vicar-general John of Nepomuk by royal officials in 1393 sparked a noble rebellion. In 1394 Wenceslaus' cousin Jobst of Moravia was named regent, while Wenceslaus was arrested at Králův Dvůr. King Sigismund of Hungary arranged a truce in 1396, and for his efforts he was recognized as heir to Wenceslaus.

In the Papal Schism, Wenceslaus had supported the Roman Pope Urban VI. As Bohemian king he sought to protect the religious reformer Jan Hus and his followers against the demands of the Roman Catholic Church for their suppression as heretics. This caused many Germans to withdraw from the University of Prague, and set up their own university at Leipzig.

He then met Charles VI of France at Reims, where the two monarchs decided to persuade the rival popes, now Benedict XIII and Boniface IX, to resign, and to end the papal schisms by the election of a new pontiff. Many of the princes were angry at this abandonment of Boniface by Wenceslaus, who had also aroused much indignation by his long absence from Germany and by selling the title of duke of Milan to Gian Galeazzo Visconti.

Hus was eventually executed in Konstanz in 1415, and the rest of Wenceslaus' reign in Bohemia featured precursors of the Hussite Wars that would follow his death during the Defenestrations of Prague.

Dethronement

In view of his troubles in Bohemia, Wenceslaus did not seek a coronation ceremony as Holy Roman Emperor, which did little to endear him to the pope. He also was long absent from the German lands, and thus he didn't impress the Imperial nobility either. Consequently, he faced anger at the Reichstag diets of Nuremberg (1397) and Frankfurt (1398). The four Rhenish electors, Count Palatine Rupert III and the archbishops of Mainz, Cologne and Trier, accused him of failing to maintain the public peace or to resolve the Schism.  They demanded that Wenceslaus appear before them to answer to the charges in June 1400. Wenceslaus demurred, in large part because of renewed hostilities in Bohemia. When he failed to appear, the electors meeting at Lahneck Castle declared him deposed on 20 August 1400 on account of "futility, idleness, negligence and ignobility". The next day they chose Rupert as their king at Rhens. Although Wenceslaus refused to acknowledge this successor's decade-long reign, he made no move against Rupert.

On 29 June 1402 Wenceslaus was captured by Sigismund, who at first intended to escort him to Rome to have him crowned emperor, but Rupert heard of this plan and tried to prevent the passage to Italy, so that Sigismund had Wenceslaus imprisoned, at first in Schaumberg, and from 16 August in Vienna, in the charge of William, Duke of Austria.
On 20 November, Wenceslaus was forced to sign his renunciation of all his powers to Sigismund and the Dukes of Austria. In exchange, the conditions of his imprisonment were relaxed.
In early 1403, Rupert made diplomatic overtures to Sigismund, attempting to get him to forgo his attempt to secure the imperial crown. But Sigismund invaded Bohemia with Hungarian forces, looting and imposing heavy taxes, and persecuting the supporters of Wenceslaus. He also plundered the royal treasury to pay for his military campaigns against the supporters of Rupert and of Jobst of Moravia. An armistice between Sigismund and Jobst was agreed to be in effect from 14 April until 20 May. This gave Sigismund's opponents time to prepare, and after the end of the armistice, Sigismund could make no further gains and retreated from Bohemia, reaching Bratislava on 24 July.
On 1 October 1403, Pope Boniface IX finally acknowledged the deposition of Wenceslaus and the election of Rupert as King of the Romans. As a coronation of Wenceslaus was now no longer a possibility, and while he was nominally still prisoner in Vienna, he was no longer under strict guard, and he managed to escape on 11 November.
He crossed the Danube and was escorted by John II of Liechtenstein via Mikulov back to Bohemia, meeting his supporters in Kutná Hora before moving on Prague, which he entered on Christmas.

Among the charges raised by Rupert as the basis for his predecessor's deposition was the Papal Schism. King Rupert called the Council of Pisa in 1409, attended by defectors from both papal parties. They elected Antipope Alexander V, worsening the situation because he was not acknowledged by his two rivals, and from 1409 to 1417 there were three popes.

After the death of Rupert in 1410, his succession at first proved difficult, as both Wenceslaus' cousin Jobst of Moravia and Wenceslaus' brother Sigismund of Hungary were elected King of the Romans. Wenceslaus himself had never recognized his deposition and hence still claimed the kingship. Jobst died in 1411, and Wenceslaus agreed to give up the crown, so long as he could keep Bohemia. This settled the issue, and after 1411 Sigismund reigned as king and later also became Holy Roman Emperor.

The bishops and secular leaders, tired of the Great Schism, supported Sigismund when he called the Council of Constance in 1414. The goal of the council was to reform the church in head and members. In 1417, the council deposed all three popes and elected a new one. By resolving the schism, Sigismund restored the honour of the imperial title and made himself the most influential monarch in the west.

Personal life
Wenceslaus was married twice, first to Joanna of Bavaria, a scion of the Wittelsbach dynasty, on 29 September 1370. Following her death on 31 December 1386 (according to an unproven legend "mangled by one of Wenceslaus' beloved deer-hounds"), he married her first cousin once removed, Sofia of Bavaria, on 2 May 1389. He had no children by either wife.

Wenceslaus was described as a man of great knowledge and is known for the Wenceslas Bible, a richly illuminated manuscript he had drawn up between 1390 and 1400. However, his rule remained uncertain, varying between idleness and cruel measures as in the case of John of Nepomuk. Unlike his father, Wenceslaus relied on favouritism, which made him abhorrent to many nobles and led to increasing isolation. Moreover, he probably suffered from alcoholism, which was brought to light in 1398 when he was unable to accept an invitation by King Charles VI of France for a reception at Reims due to his drunkenness.

Wenceslaus died in 1419 of a heart attack during a hunt in the woods surrounding his castle Nový Hrad at Kunratice (today a part of Prague), leaving the country in a deep political crisis. His death was followed by almost two decades of conflict called the Hussite Wars, which were centred on greater calls for religious reform by Jan Hus and spurred by popular outrage provoked by his execution.

In popular culture
The 2018 video game Kingdom Come: Deliverance is set in Bohemia under the rule of King Wenceslaus IV in 1403. The plot revolves around a blacksmith's son unwittingly getting involved in the War of Succession after the death of Charles IV.

See also

List of rulers of Bohemia
Kings of Germany family tree
Decree of Kutná Hora

Notes

References
 
 Theodor Lindner. Deutsche Geschichte unter den Habsburgern und Luxemburgern. Vol. II. Stuttgart, 1893.

Further reading

External links

Wenceslas (king of Bohemia and Germany) at Encyclopædia Britannica

|-

|-

|-

Medieval kings of Bohemia
1361 births
1419 deaths
14th-century Bohemian people
15th-century Bohemian people
14th-century Kings of the Romans
Prince-electors of Brandenburg
Dukes of Luxembourg
House of Luxembourg
People from Nuremberg
People of the Hussite Wars
Burials at St. Vitus Cathedral
Czech people of Luxembourgian descent
15th-century people of the Holy Roman Empire
14th-century Luxembourgian people
15th-century Luxembourgian people
15th-century monarchs in Europe
Dethroned monarchs
Sons of emperors
Children of Charles IV, Holy Roman Emperor